M. robustus  may refer to:
 Macropus robustus, the Eastern wallaroo, common wallaroo, hill wallaroo or euro, a large mammal species found throughout much of the Australian mainland
 Melanochromis robustus, a fish species found in Malawi and Tanzania
 Melichneutes robustus, the lyre-tailed honeyguide, a bird species found in Africa

Synonyms
 Moroteuthis robustus, a synonym for Moroteuthis robusta, the robust clubhook squid, a squid species found primarily in the boreal to temperate North Pacific

See also
 Robustus (disambiguation)